Sandy Creek is a tributary of the Ohio River in western West Virginia in the United States.

Sandy Creek is formed in north-central Jackson County by the confluence of its left and right forks:
The Left Fork is paralleled for most of its course by the former U.S. Route 21 (now a county highway).

From the confluence of the left and right forks south of Sandyville, Sandy Creek flows west-northwestward, through the community of Silverton to Ravenswood, where it flows into the Ohio River from the east.

According to the West Virginia Department of Environmental Protection, approximately 80% of the Sandy Creek watershed is forested, mostly deciduous.  Approximately 19% is used for pasture and agriculture, and less than 1% is urban.

According to the Geographic Names Information System, it has also been known historically as Big Sandy Creek and as Buffalo Creek.  A 1906 report of the West Virginia Department of Archives transcribes the name in an unspecified Native American language as Mol-chu-con-ic-kon.

See also
List of West Virginia rivers

References

Rivers of Jackson County, West Virginia
Rivers of West Virginia
Tributaries of the Ohio River